Orgeix is a commune in the Ariège department in southwestern France.

It is located just two kilometers from the hot springs and ski resort Ax-les-Thermes and European Route E09

Population
Inhabitants are called Orgeixois.

See also
Communes of the Ariège department

References

Communes of Ariège (department)
Ariège communes articles needing translation from French Wikipedia